Euwallacea interjectus, is a species of weevil native to Asia but introduced to Westerns parts of the world.

Distribution
It is found in Myanmar, Japan, Korea, China, Taiwan, Tibet, India, Indonesia (Borneo, Java, Mentawei, Sumatra), Malaysia, Sarawak, Nepal, Philippines, Sri Lanka, Thailand, Vietnam, United States and Argentina.

Biology
A large shothole borer, where the larva generally prefers host trees stressed by an occasional excessive abundance of water. Even the other ambrosia beetles live in dead tree trunks, this beetle is a parasite on living trees. Adults and larvae feed on fungal mycelia, which is inoculated into the xylem. Later, fungus develops on the walls of the galleries tunneled in the sapwood which are colonized by adult females.

A polyphagous beetle, adult is a vector of plant pathogenic fungus, Ceratocystis ficicola, which has caused serious wilt disease in many fig orchards in Japan. To store the fungus, they have a structure called "mycangium". They are strongly attracted to the plants in the family Urticaceae.

References 

Curculionidae
Insects of Sri Lanka
Beetles described in 1894